The 1982 Kansas gubernatorial election was held on November 2, 1982. Incumbent Democrat John W. Carlin defeated Republican nominee Sam Hardage with 53.2% of the vote.

, this marks the last occasion in which Thomas County has voted Democratic in a gubernatorial election, and the last time a male Democrat was elected Governor of Kansas.

Primary elections
Primary elections were held on August 3, 1982.

Democratic primary

Candidates
John W. Carlin, incumbent Governor
Jimmy D. Montgomery

Results

Republican primary

Candidates
Sam Hardage, businessman
Dave Owen, former Lieutenant Governor
Wendell Lady, Speaker of the Kansas House of Representatives
Louis A. Klemp Jr., Leavenworth County Commissioner
Bill Huffman

Results

General election

Candidates
Major party candidates
John W. Carlin, Democratic
Sam Hardage, Republican 

Other candidates
James H. Ward, Libertarian
Frank W. Shelton Jr., American
Warren C. Martin, Prohibition

Results

References

1982
Kansas
Gubernatorial